"Brian Wilson" is a song by Canadian rock band Barenaked Ladies from their 1992 album Gordon. The song was written by Steven Page as a tribute to the Beach Boys' co-founder Brian Wilson. It was released as a single and peaked at number 18 on the Canadian Singles Chart. In 1998, the song peaked at number 68 on the US Billboard Hot 100. Wilson himself covered the song on his live album Live at the Roxy Theatre (2000).

Background and lyricism

The song was written by singer/guitarist Steven Page in his parents' basement around his twentieth birthday, in 1990. The first lines of the song chronicle one of his many late-night journeys to the Sam the Record Man on Yonge Street. The song generally tells the story of a man whose life parallels that of the Beach Boys' Brian Wilson, particularly during his time spent with psychologist Eugene Landy after Wilson was diagnosed with mental illness, and, more broadly, with lyrics about suffering from comorbid mental illness and obesity.

Variations
Steven Page stated in the liner notes for Disc One: All Their Greatest Hits that the song has more "official" recordings than any other song in their repertoire, saying that there are at least five. The song was first recorded for the never-released 1990 BNL cassette, Barenaked Recess. After Tyler Stewart joined the band in 1991 as a drummer, it was re-recorded for the band's platinum-selling Yellow Tape, in 1992 for Gordon, in 1996 for the live album Rock Spectacle, and again in 1997 for a version which was called "Brian Wilson 2000" and was released as a single.

Brian Wilson 2000

"Brian Wilson 2000" is a shortened form of the song for radio play, recorded to sound more like their live performance than the original Gordon version did. The band's management worried that radio stations would not play the live version that had recently gained popularity. The most noticeable differences are that "2000" replaces the first verse with an 8-bar instrumental introduction, and the outro is considerably shortened as well. However, most radio stations decided to play the live version instead, which explains why the live version was included on Disc One: All Their Greatest Hits.

The U.S. release included the non-album song "Back."

A music video for "Brian Wilson 2000" was filmed at The Opera House in Toronto on February 22, 1998 and released later that year.

Brian Wilson version
Wilson rearranged and sang this song a cappella with his new band at live concerts, one of which was recorded for a live album in 2000. Wilson visited Barenaked Ladies while they were recording Maroon (album producer Don Was was an associate of Brian Wilson) whereupon they played him some of their works-in-progress, and then he played them his version of "Brian Wilson". At the end, he turned to them and asked, "Is it cool?" Upon his departure, his advice to the band was "don't eat too much." The band described the entire experience as surreal.

In honour of his covering their song, in recent performances the band has started singing the first chorus a cappella, eliminating all instrumentation, and then continuing the rest of the song with the usual arrangement.

Personnel
 Steven Page – acoustic guitar, lead vocals
 Ed Robertson – acoustic guitar, backing vocals
 Jim Creeggan – double bass, backing vocals
 Andy Creeggan – congas, backing vocals
 Tyler Stewart – drums

Chart positions
Barenaked Ladies single

References

1992 singles
1997 singles
Barenaked Ladies songs
Songs written by Steven Page
Brian Wilson
1990 songs
Songs about mental health
Reprise Records singles
Songs based on actual events
Songs about the Beach Boys